Imre Hajdú (26 January 1911 – 21 October 1989) better known by his stage name Jean Image was a Hungarian-French director, script writer and producer of French animation films.

His stage name, "Image" is based upon the French pronunciation of "Im-Haj", the first syllables of his name.

In 1959, he participated in the creation of Annecy International Animated Film Festival.

Jean Image was also the author of a book on animation titled "Le Dessin animé : initiation à la technique" (1979).

Career
He emigrated to France in 1932 where he worked on films and eventually produced several shorts on his own. After the war, influenced by the classic style of Walt Disney's films, he became the first French producer of the full-length animated film (Johnny the Giant Killer). In 1948, he founded the Films Jean Image company and in 1960 he devoted himself to producing television cartoon series. Two of these series (Kiri le Clown and Joe), have become very popular.

Personal life 
His first wife was Eraine Image (born Germaine Suzanne Charvot). He was later married to France Image, with whom he co-wrote his later movies and series.

Filmography

Film

Short-film

Television
 Joe the Little Boom Boom (TV series, 1960 – 1963)
 Joë chez les fourmis  (1962)
 La Fontaine des trois soldats, TV series of 26 episodes (1963)
 Joë au royaume des mouches  (1964)
 Picolo et Piccolette  (1964)
 Kiri le clown  (1966)
 Patatomanie (1970)
 Au clair de lune (1971-1972)
 Arago X-001 (1972–1973)
 Le Crayon magique (1973)
 Les Rêves de Jeannot (series, 1985–1986)

References

External links 
 Jean Image 
 

1910 births
1989 deaths
French animators
20th-century French non-fiction writers
French film directors
French animated film directors
French animated film producers
20th-century French male writers
Hungarian emigrants to France
Film people from Budapest